Fouad Twal (born 23 October 1940 in Madaba, Jordan) is a Jordanian Catholic prelate who served as Latin Patriarchate of Jerusalem from 2008 to 2016. He has also served as the Grand Prior of the Equestrian Order of the Holy Sepulchre of Jerusalem and President for the Assembly of Catholic Ordinaries of the Holy Land.

Biography

Fouad Twal was ordained to the priesthood on 29 June 1966. After his ordination he was the vicar of Ramallah.  In 1972 he entered the Pontifical Lateran University where he studied for a doctorate in canon law, which he was awarded in 1975. He was appointed the prelate of the territorial prelature of Tunis by Pope John Paul II on 30 May 1992. He was consecrated to the episcopate on 22 July later that year by principal consecrator Patriarch Michel Sabbah. On 31 May 1995, Pope John Paul II gave the Tunis territorial prelature diocesan status, creating the Diocese of Tunis, and appointed as Twal was made an archbishop ad personam. In 2005, Pope Benedict XVI named him the coadjutor archbishop-patriarch of the Latin Patriarchate of Jerusalem; he succeeded Michel Sabbah as the Patriarch on 21 June 2008 and was enthroned Jerusalem's Church of the Holy Sepulchre the next day. A week later, he received the pallium from the hands of Pope Benedict XVI at a Mass in Rome's Basilica of Saint Peter.

In 2008, he explained his understanding of the situation of Israel and the Palestinian Territories and their people: "We receive a lot of help and we are grateful but at the same time we say we need more. What we need is peace. We don’t only want to be a begging Church, we don't want to be beggars with a licence. I don't like this. We need a political horizon, it's time to put an end to the Wall, the Checkpoints, it's time for a Palestinian State, it's time for an end to our problems with visas."

On 19 February 2014 he was appointed a member of the Congregation for the Oriental Churches.

In June 2016 Pope Francis accepted Twal's resignation as patriarch.

Additional positions
Grand Prior of the Equestrian Order of the Holy Sepulchre of Jerusalem 
President ex officio of the Assembly of Catholic Ordinaries of the Holy Land
President ex officio of the Conference of Latin Bishops of the Arab Regions
member, Council of Catholic Patriarchs of the East
member of the following dicastery of the Roman Curia
Congregation for the Oriental Churches
Pontifical Council for the Family

Gallery

See also
 Christianity in Jordan
 Latin Patriarchs of Jerusalem

References

1940 births
Living people
20th-century Roman Catholic bishops in Tunisia
21st-century Roman Catholic archbishops in Jordan
Pontifical Ecclesiastical Academy alumni
Latin Patriarchs of Jerusalem
People from Madaba Governorate
Territorial prelates
Members of the Congregation for the Oriental Churches
Members of the Order of the Holy Sepulchre